The 2005–06 Boston Bruins season was their 82nd season of operation. The Bruins slipped to 13th in the Eastern Conference and did not qualify for the 2006 Stanley Cup playoffs.

Off-season
Key dates prior to the start of the season:

The 2005 NHL Entry Draft took place in Ottawa, Ontario, on July 30, 2005.
The free agency period began on August 1.

Regular season
After Joe Thornton voiced his unhappiness with his contract in Boston in 2005, many teams reportedly sent offers to the Bruins. However, Thornton re-signed with the team on August 11, 2005, on a three-year contract worth US$20 million. On November 30, 2005, he was traded to the San Jose Sharks in a blockbuster four-player deal which sent forwards Marco Sturm and Wayne Primeau and defenseman Brad Stuart to Boston. Thornton was the team's leading scorer at the time by a substantial margin and many felt Bruins general manager Mike O'Connell had traded away one of the few players who was truly showing an exemplary effort. On January 10, 2006, Thornton returned to Boston as a member of the Sharks, but was ejected for checking Bruins' defenseman Hal Gill from behind at 5:13 of the first period. Thornton received a five-minute major and a game misconduct. The misconduct was later rescinded by the NHL.

The Bruins ended up finishing with the third-worst record in the Eastern Conference, but the story of the season for the team was the emergence of goaltender Tim Thomas. Thomas had been in the Bruins organization before and had become a star in Europe before deciding to give the NHL one last try. Injuries to incumbent starter Andrew Raycroft and backup Hannu Toivonen pushed Thomas into the starting role, one that he did not relinquish until after the 2011–12 season.

Final standings

Schedule and results

|- align="center" bgcolor="#FFBBBB"
|1||L||October 5, 2005||1–2 || align="left"|  Montreal Canadiens (2005–06) ||0–1–0 || 
|- align="center" bgcolor="#FFBBBB"
|2||L||October 7, 2005||1–4 || align="left"| @ Buffalo Sabres (2005–06) ||0–2–0 || 
|- align="center" bgcolor="#CCFFCC" 
|3||W||October 8, 2005||7–6 OT|| align="left"| @ Pittsburgh Penguins (2005–06) ||1–2–0 || 
|- align="center" bgcolor="#CCFFCC" 
|4||W||October 10, 2005||4–2 || align="left"| @ Tampa Bay Lightning (2005–06) ||2–2–0 || 
|- align="center" bgcolor="#CCFFCC" 
|5||W||October 13, 2005||5–2 || align="left"| @ Florida Panthers (2005–06) ||3–2–0 || 
|- align="center" bgcolor="#FFBBBB"
|6||L||October 15, 2005||1–5 || align="left"| @ Ottawa Senators (2005–06) ||3–3–0 || 
|- align="center" bgcolor="#FFBBBB"
|7||L||October 18, 2005||3–4 || align="left"| @ Montreal Canadiens (2005–06) ||3–4–0 || 
|- align="center" bgcolor="#FFBBBB"
|8||L||October 20, 2005||3–4 || align="left"|  Buffalo Sabres (2005–06) ||3–5–0 || 
|- align="center" bgcolor="#CCFFCC" 
|9||W||October 22, 2005||6–3 || align="left"|  Pittsburgh Penguins (2005–06) ||4–5–0 || 
|- align="center" 
|10||L||October 24, 2005||4–5 SO|| align="left"| @ Toronto Maple Leafs (2005–06) ||4–5–1 || 
|- align="center" 
|11||L||October 26, 2005||3–4 OT|| align="left"| @ Carolina Hurricanes (2005–06) ||4–5–2 || 
|- align="center" bgcolor="#CCFFCC" 
|12||W||October 27, 2005||2–1 || align="left"|  Toronto Maple Leafs (2005–06) ||5–5–2 || 
|- align="center" 
|13||L||October 29, 2005||4–5 SO|| align="left"|  New Jersey Devils (2005–06) ||5–5–3 || 
|-

|- align="center" 
|14||L||November 1, 2005||3–4 OT|| align="left"| @ New York Islanders (2005–06) ||5–5–4 || 
|- align="center" bgcolor="#CCFFCC" 
|15||W||November 3, 2005||4–1 || align="left"|  Florida Panthers (2005–06) ||6–5–4 || 
|- align="center" bgcolor="#CCFFCC" 
|16||W||November 5, 2005||6–3 || align="left"|  Pittsburgh Penguins (2005–06) ||7–5–4 || 
|- align="center" 
|17||L||November 8, 2005||3–4 OT|| align="left"| @ Philadelphia Flyers (2005–06) ||7–5–5 || 
|- align="center" bgcolor="#FFBBBB"
|18||L||November 10, 2005||2–5 || align="left"|  Ottawa Senators (2005–06) ||7–6–5 || 
|- align="center" bgcolor="#FFBBBB"
|19||L||November 12, 2005||2–5 || align="left"| @ New York Islanders (2005–06) ||7–7–5 || 
|- align="center" bgcolor="#FFBBBB"
|20||L||November 17, 2005||1–4 || align="left"|  Toronto Maple Leafs (2005–06) ||7–8–5 || 
|- align="center" bgcolor="#FFBBBB"
|21||L||November 19, 2005||2–3 || align="left"|  Buffalo Sabres (2005–06) ||7–9–5 || 
|- align="center" bgcolor="#FFBBBB"
|22||L||November 20, 2005||2–3 || align="left"| @ New York Rangers (2005–06) ||7–10–5 || 
|- align="center" bgcolor="#CCFFCC" 
|23||W||November 23, 2005||5–1 || align="left"| @ Toronto Maple Leafs (2005–06) ||8–10–5 || 
|- align="center" bgcolor="#FFBBBB"
|24||L||November 25, 2005||3–5 || align="left"|  Philadelphia Flyers (2005–06) ||8–11–5 || 
|- align="center" bgcolor="#FFBBBB"
|25||L||November 26, 2005||2–4 || align="left"| @ Ottawa Senators (2005–06) ||8–12–5 || 
|- align="center" bgcolor="#FFBBBB"
|26||L||November 29, 2005||2–3 || align="left"| @ New Jersey Devils (2005–06) ||8–13–5 || 
|-

|- align="center" bgcolor="#CCFFCC" 
|27||W||December 1, 2005||3–0 || align="left"|  Ottawa Senators (2005–06) ||9–13–5 || 
|- align="center" bgcolor="#CCFFCC" 
|28||W||December 3, 2005||5–4 OT|| align="left"| @ Edmonton Oilers (2005–06) ||10–13–5 || 
|- align="center" bgcolor="#FFBBBB"
|29||L||December 4, 2005||2–5 || align="left"| @ Vancouver Canucks (2005–06) ||10–14–5 || 
|- align="center" bgcolor="#FFBBBB"
|30||L||December 7, 2005||1–4 || align="left"| @ Colorado Avalanche (2005–06) ||10–15–5 || 
|- align="center" 
|31||L||December 11, 2005||1–2 OT|| align="left"|  Phoenix Coyotes (2005–06) ||10–15–6 || 
|- align="center" bgcolor="#CCFFCC" 
|32||W||December 15, 2005||3–2 || align="left"| @ Minnesota Wild (2005–06) ||11–15–6 || 
|- align="center" bgcolor="#FFBBBB"
|33||L||December 17, 2005||0–3 || align="left"| @ Calgary Flames (2005–06) ||11–16–6 || 
|- align="center" bgcolor="#CCFFCC" 
|34||W||December 22, 2005||4–1 || align="left"|  Toronto Maple Leafs (2005–06) ||12–16–6 || 
|- align="center" bgcolor="#FFBBBB"
|35||L||December 23, 2005||1–2 || align="left"| @ Toronto Maple Leafs (2005–06) ||12–17–6 || 
|- align="center" bgcolor="#CCFFCC" 
|36||W||December 27, 2005||4–3 OT|| align="left"| @ Washington Capitals (2005–06) ||13–17–6 || 
|- align="center" bgcolor="#FFBBBB"
|37||L||December 28, 2005||4–6 || align="left"| @ Florida Panthers (2005–06) ||13–18–6 || 
|- align="center" bgcolor="#CCFFCC" 
|38||W||December 30, 2005||2–1 || align="left"| @ Tampa Bay Lightning (2005–06) ||14–18–6 || 
|-

|- align="center" bgcolor="#FFBBBB"
|39||L||January 2, 2006||0–1 || align="left"|  Philadelphia Flyers (2005–06) ||14–19–6 || 
|- align="center" bgcolor="#CCFFCC" 
|40||W||January 5, 2006||4–2 || align="left"|  Ottawa Senators (2005–06) ||15–19–6 || 
|- align="center" bgcolor="#CCFFCC" 
|41||W||January 7, 2006||6–3 || align="left"|  Tampa Bay Lightning (2005–06) ||16–19–6 || 
|- align="center" bgcolor="#FFBBBB"
|42||L||January 10, 2006||2–6 || align="left"|  San Jose Sharks (2005–06) ||16–20–6 || 
|- align="center" bgcolor="#FFBBBB"
|43||L||January 12, 2006||0–6 || align="left"|  Los Angeles Kings (2005–06) ||16–21–6 || 
|- align="center" 
|44||L||January 14, 2006||1–2 SO|| align="left"|  Dallas Stars (2005–06) ||16–21–7 || 
|- align="center" bgcolor="#CCFFCC" 
|45||W||January 16, 2006||4–3 OT|| align="left"|  Mighty Ducks of Anaheim (2005–06) ||17–21–7 || 
|- align="center" bgcolor="#CCFFCC" 
|46||W||January 19, 2006||5–2 || align="left"| @ Philadelphia Flyers (2005–06) ||18–21–7 || 
|- align="center" 
|47||L||January 21, 2006||2–3 SO|| align="left"|  New York Rangers (2005–06) ||18–21–8 || 
|- align="center" bgcolor="#CCFFCC" 
|48||W||January 23, 2006||3–2 || align="left"| @ Washington Capitals (2005–06) ||19–21–8 || 
|- align="center" bgcolor="#CCFFCC" 
|49||W||January 24, 2006||3–2 || align="left"| @ Atlanta Thrashers (2005–06) ||20–21–8 || 
|- align="center" bgcolor="#CCFFCC" 
|50||W||January 26, 2006||3–2 || align="left"|  Washington Capitals (2005–06) ||21–21–8 || 
|- align="center" bgcolor="#FFBBBB"
|51||L||January 28, 2006||3–4 || align="left"|  New York Islanders (2005–06) ||21–22–8 || 
|- align="center" bgcolor="#CCFFCC" 
|52||W||January 30, 2006||5–0 || align="left"| @ Ottawa Senators (2005–06) ||22–22–8 || 
|-

|- align="center" bgcolor="#CCFFCC" 
|53||W||February 2, 2006||3–1 || align="left"|  Montreal Canadiens (2005–06) ||23–22–8 || 
|- align="center" bgcolor="#FFBBBB"
|54||L||February 4, 2006||0–2 || align="left"| @ Montreal Canadiens (2005–06) ||23–23–8 || 
|- align="center" 
|55||L||February 5, 2006||3–4 SO|| align="left"|  Carolina Hurricanes (2005–06) ||23–23–9 || 
|- align="center" bgcolor="#CCFFCC" 
|56||W||February 8, 2006||3–1 || align="left"| @ Pittsburgh Penguins (2005–06) ||24–23–9 || 
|- align="center" 
|57||L||February 9, 2006||2–3 OT|| align="left"|  New Jersey Devils (2005–06) ||24–23–10 || 
|- align="center" bgcolor="#FFBBBB"
|58||L||February 11, 2006||5–6 || align="left"|  Tampa Bay Lightning (2005–06) ||24–24–10 || 
|-

|- align="center" bgcolor="#FFBBBB"
|59||L||March 1, 2006||3–4 || align="left"| @ Carolina Hurricanes (2005–06) ||24–25–10 || 
|- align="center" bgcolor="#CCFFCC" 
|60||W||March 2, 2006||3–2 || align="left"|  Atlanta Thrashers (2005–06) ||25–25–10 || 
|- align="center" bgcolor="#FFBBBB"
|61||L||March 4, 2006||2–3 || align="left"|  Buffalo Sabres (2005–06) ||25–26–10 || 
|- align="center" bgcolor="#FFBBBB"
|62||L||March 7, 2006||2–3 || align="left"| @ Buffalo Sabres (2005–06) ||25–27–10 || 
|- align="center" bgcolor="#FFBBBB"
|63||L||March 9, 2006||0–3 || align="left"|  Montreal Canadiens (2005–06) ||25–28–10 || 
|- align="center" bgcolor="#FFBBBB"
|64||L||March 11, 2006||1–3 || align="left"|  New York Islanders (2005–06) ||25–29–10 || 
|- align="center" bgcolor="#FFBBBB"
|65||L||March 12, 2006||2–6 || align="left"| @ Buffalo Sabres (2005–06) ||25–30–10 || 
|- align="center" 
|66||L||March 14, 2006||4–5 SO|| align="left"| @ Toronto Maple Leafs (2005–06) ||25–30–11 || 
|- align="center" bgcolor="#CCFFCC" 
|67||W||March 16, 2006||3–2 SO|| align="left"|  Ottawa Senators (2005–06) ||26–30–11 || 
|- align="center" bgcolor="#CCFFCC" 
|68||W||March 18, 2006||4–2 || align="left"|  Carolina Hurricanes (2005–06) ||27–30–11 || 
|- align="center" bgcolor="#FFBBBB"
|69||L||March 20, 2006||2–5 || align="left"| @ New York Rangers (2005–06) ||27–31–11 || 
|- align="center" 
|70||L||March 21, 2006||4–5 SO|| align="left"|  Atlanta Thrashers (2005–06) ||27–31–12 || 
|- align="center" bgcolor="#FFBBBB"
|71||L||March 24, 2006||2–4 || align="left"| @ New Jersey Devils (2005–06) ||27–32–12 || 
|- align="center" bgcolor="#CCFFCC" 
|72||W||March 25, 2006||5–4 || align="left"|  Buffalo Sabres (2005–06) ||28–32–12 || 
|- align="center" 
|73||L||March 27, 2006||3–4 SO|| align="left"|  Florida Panthers (2005–06) ||28–32–13 || 
|- align="center" bgcolor="#FFBBBB"
|74||L||March 29, 2006||3–4 || align="left"| @ Buffalo Sabres (2005–06) ||28–33–13 || 
|-

|- align="center" bgcolor="#FFBBBB"
|75||L||April 1, 2006||0–2 || align="left"| @ Montreal Canadiens (2005–06) ||28–34–13 || 
|- align="center" bgcolor="#FFBBBB"
|76||L||April 4, 2006||3–5 || align="left"| @ Montreal Canadiens (2005–06) ||28–35–13 || 
|- align="center" bgcolor="#CCFFCC" 
|77||W||April 6, 2006||3–2 SO|| align="left"|  Toronto Maple Leafs (2005–06) ||29–35–13 || 
|- align="center" 
|78||L||April 8, 2006||3–4 OT|| align="left"|  New York Rangers (2005–06) ||29–35–14 || 
|- align="center" 
|79||L||April 10, 2006||1–2 OT|| align="left"|  Washington Capitals (2005–06) ||29–35–15 || 
|- align="center" 
|80||L||April 11, 2006||3–4 OT|| align="left"| @ Ottawa Senators (2005–06) ||29–35–16 || 
|- align="center" bgcolor="#FFBBBB"
|81||L||April 13, 2006||3–4 || align="left"|  Montreal Canadiens (2005–06) ||29–36–16 || 
|- align="center" bgcolor="#FFBBBB"
|82||L||April 15, 2006||3–4 || align="left"| @ Atlanta Thrashers (2005–06) ||29–37–16 || 
|-

|-
| Legend:

Player statistics

Scoring
 Position abbreviations: C = Center; D = Defense; G = Goaltender; LW = Left Wing; RW = Right Wing
  = Joined team via a transaction (e.g., trade, waivers, signing) during the season. Stats reflect time with the Bruins only.
  = Left team via a transaction (e.g., trade, waivers, release) during the season. Stats reflect time with the Bruins only.

Goaltending

Awards and records

Awards

Milestones

Transactions
The Bruins were involved in the following transactions from February 17, 2005, the day after the 2004–05 NHL season was officially cancelled, through June 19, 2006, the day of the deciding game of the 2006 Stanley Cup Finals.

Trades

Players acquired

Players lost

Signings

Draft picks
The 2005 NHL Entry Draft was the 43rd NHL Entry Draft. As a lockout cancelled the 2004–05 NHL season, the draft order was determined by lottery on July 22, 2005. Teams were assigned 1 to 3 balls based on their playoff appearances and first overall draft picks from the past three years. According to the draft order, the selection worked its way up to 30 as usual; then instead of repeating the order as in past years, the draft "snaked" back down to the team with the first pick. Therefore the team with the first pick overall would not pick again until the 60th pick. The team with the 30th pick would also get the 31st pick. The draft was only seven rounds in length, compared to nine rounds in years past. The labor dispute caused the shortened draft.

 Boston's picks at the 2005 NHL Entry Draft in Ottawa, Ontario, Canada.

Farm teams
The Bruins' American Hockey League (AHL) affiliate was the Providence Bruins. The Bruins had 43 wins and 92 points and finished in fourth place in their division. The Bruins were eliminated in the first round of the playoffs against Portland. Eric Healey and Tim Thomas were selected to the AHL All-Star Game and Healey was the captain for PlanetUSA. Jonathan Sigalet was nominated for the AHL Man of the Year Award.

See also
2005–06 NHL season

Notes

References

 

Boston Bruins
Boston Bruins
Boston Bruins seasons
Boston Bruins
Boston Bruins
Bruins
Bruins